"My Name Is Kay" is a song by the Canadian singer/songwriter My Name Is Kay.  Even though the song received single status in Canada, Kay does not consider it her first single. This is because the track was never intended to be released as a single, however due to the popular demand for the song, it was released as a single in Canada by Universal Music. The song originally premiered on February 10, 2011, on Kay's official SoundCloud account. Although considered her debut single, My Name Is Kay considers it, along with "Strangers", as just "a song".

Charts

References

2011 songs
Songs written by Ryan Tedder
Songs written by E. Kidd Bogart
Song recordings produced by Ryan Tedder
Songs written by Noel Zancanella